West Dummerston is an unincorporated village and census-designated place (CDP) in the town of Dummerston, Windham County, Vermont, United States. The community is located along Vermont Route 30 and the West River 
 north-northwest of Brattleboro. West Dummerston has a post office with ZIP code 05357.

References

Census-designated places in Windham County, Vermont
Census-designated places in Vermont
Unincorporated communities in Windham County, Vermont
Unincorporated communities in Vermont